Wesbrook is a surname. Notable people with the name include:

Coy Wayne Wesbrook (1958–2016), American mass murderer
Frank Wesbrook (1868–1918), Canadian physician and academic
Walter Wesbrook (1898–1991), American tennis player and coach

See also
Westbrook (surname)